Chinese people in Sweden include people born in the People's Republic of China, or have ancestry from there. It may also include people originating from Taiwan and Hong Kong. They form a sizable community and are one of the biggest Asian groups. As of 2021, there are 37,172 mainland Chinese immigrants in Sweden.

History 

The first known documented arrival of a Chinese individual in Sweden was Choi Afock in 1786, a translator employed by the Swedish East India Company.

In the mid-1970s, Chinese people began immigrating to Sweden, where they largely made a living by running Chinese-themed restaurants.

Demographics
25% of Sweden's reduced number of international university students after tuition fees were introduced for non-EU/EEA applicants come from China.

See also 
 China–Sweden relations

References

 
Sweden
Sweden
Ethnic groups in Sweden